Ozolotepec may refer to:

Geography
Santo Domingo Ozolotepec, Oaxaca
San Juan Ozolotepec, Oaxaca
Santa María Ozolotepec, Oaxaca
San Marcial Ozolotepec, Oaxaca

Languages
Ozolotepec Zapotec